Saint-Mandé is a high-end commune of the Val-de-Marne department in Île-de-France in the eastern suburbs of Paris, France. It is one of the smallest communes of the Île-de-France by land area, but is one of the most densely populated municipalities in Europe. It is located on the edge of the 12th arrondissement of Paris, near the Porte de Vincennes and the Porte de Saint-Mandé.
The motto of the city is Cresco et Floresco, which means "I grow and I flourish".

History
On 1 January 1860, the city of Paris was enlarged by annexing neighboring communes. On that occasion, about two-thirds of the commune of Saint-Mandé was annexed to Paris, and now forms the neighborhoods of Bel-Air and Picpus, in the 12th arrondissement of Paris.

In 1929, the commune of Saint-Mandé lost one-quarter of its territory when the city of Paris annexed the Bois de Vincennes, a small part of which belonged to Saint-Mandé, leaving Saint-Mandé as a small rump commune after the territorial losses of 1860 and 1929.

Population

Personalities
Juliette Benzoni (1920–2016), novel writer
Charles Berling ( 1958), actor
Françoise Blanchard (1954–2013), actress
Maurice Boitel (1919–2007), painter
Armand Carrel (1800–1836), political writer, who died there in a duel
Gaëtan Charbonnier ( 1988), footballer
Claudette Colbert (1903–1996), actress
Georges Courteline (1858–1929), writer and lampoonist
Bruno Cremer (1929–2010), actor
Alexandra David-Néel (1868–1969), Asian scholar
Frédéric Diefenthal ( 1968), actor
Juliette Drouet (1806–1883), mistress of Victor Hugo
Grégory Fitoussi ( 1976), actor
Alfred Grévin (1827–1892), caricaturist, founder of Musée Grévin
Benoît Chomel de Jarnieu ( 1955), Naval Admiral
 Jacqueline Lamba Breton, (1910–1993) was a French painter and married (1934–1943) to André Breton
Paul Nicolas (1899–1959), footballer
Christine Nougaret ( 1958), archivist
Charles Nungesser (1892–1927), aviator
Guillaume Jonquieres, footballer
Benoît Puga (b.1953), French Army General, Grand Chancellor of the National Order of the Legion of Honour and the National Order of Merit

Transport
The municipality is crossed by a principal north–south axis, the Avenue du Général-de-Gaulle (formerly Rue de la République), and by an east–west axis, the Avenue de Paris (RN 34). Another important and historical street of the municipality is the Chaussée de l'Étang which goes along the Bois de Vincennes.
Saint-Mandé is served by Saint-Mandé station on Paris Métro Line 1, as well as line no 8. RATP buses include lines 46, 56, 86 and 325. 

Education
Schools include:
 Preschools/nurseries (maternelles): Paul Bert, Charles Digeon, La Tourelle, E.G. Tillion preschool
 Elementary schools: Paul Bert, Charles Digeon, E.G. Tillion elementary

Junior high school students are served by Ecole & Collège Decroly, and Collège Jacques Offenbach.

The private school system Ensemble Scolaire St Michel de Picpus maintains a secondary campus in Saint-Mandé.

Twin towns
Saint-Mandé is twinned with:
 Waltham Forest, London, United Kingdom since 21 April 1956
 Eschwege, Hesse, Germany since 23 September 1989
 Concord, Massachusetts, United States since 15 March 1997
 Tres Cantos, Community of Madrid, Spain since 12 March 2005
 Drogheda, Ireland since 9 September 2011
 Yanggu, Gangwon, South Korea since 12 October 2011
 Vila Verde, Braga, Portugal since 13 April 2013

See also
Communes of the Val-de-Marne department

References

External links
Official website (in French)

Communes of Val-de-Marne